Arctic Dreams: Imagination and Desire in a Northern Landscape is a 1986 nonfiction book by Barry Lopez. It won the National Book Award for Nonfiction, the Christopher Medal, a Pacific Northwest Booksellers Association Award, and an Oregon Book Award for literary nonfiction. It was a National Book Critics Circle Award finalist.

Arctic Dreams (1986) describes five years in the Alaskan and Canadian Arctic, where Lopez worked as a biologist. Robert Macfarlane, reviewing the book in The Guardian, describes him as "the most important living writer about wilderness". In The New York Times, Michiko Kakutani argued that Arctic Dreams "is a book about the Arctic North in the way that Moby-Dick is a novel about whales".

References

1986 non-fiction books
National Book Award for Nonfiction winning works
Books about the Arctic